Poppy.Computer is the debut studio album by American singer and YouTube personality Poppy. It was released on October 6, 2017, by Mad Decent, followed by a 34-city, 40-concert Poppy.Computer Tour.

Background
Poppy.Computer was written in Los Angeles during 2016 by Poppy and Titanic Sinclair, with help from songwriter Simon Wilcox and Chris Greatti of Blame Candy. Near the end of the year, Poppy and Titanic went to Japan to work with producers on the record, then went back in the spring of 2017 to finish it.

On May 6, 2017, Poppy confirmed on Twitter that her debut album was finished. On the same tweet Poppy also confirmed that there would be a tour to promote the album and that she knows when the album will be released. When asked by a fan if she could release the album herself she stated, "There's too much fun to be had from now to then." After being interviewed for an article with the Wired, the website accidentally leaked the release date of Poppy's album as October 6, 2017, which is also the anniversary of Poppy's YouTube channel creation.

On September 8, 2017, Poppy officially announced her upcoming album in the video "Poppy.Computer".

A remix EP was released on iTunes on March 16, 2018.

Singles
 "I'm Poppy" was released on February 14, 2017, as the first single from Poppy.Computer.
 "Computer Boy" was released on May 19, 2017, as the second single from the album.
 "Let's Make a Video" was released on June 22, 2017, as the third single from Poppy.Computer A music video was released on July 11, 2017.
 "Interweb" was released as the fourth single on July 17, 2017, with a music video released on July 21, 2017. To promote the single, she made her late night debut to perform the song on The Late Late Show with James Corden.
 "My Style" was released as the fifth single on September 1, 2017.

Music videos were also released for "Moshi Moshi" on November 10, 2017 and "Bleach Blonde Baby" on December 13, 2017. The latter was also performed on Total Request Live on January 29, 2018.

Critical reception

AllMusic's Neil Z. Yeung noted an "injection" of J-pop into Poppy's "computer veins", mentioning that the album results in a "winking piece of art pop that sounds like Fame-era Lady Gaga meets Grimes or L.A.M.B.-era Gwen Stefani going full 'Harajuku Girl[s]'", also suggesting to "think of this as the 'Material Girl' for the Internet age". Rolling Stones Maura Johnston said that "[it] adds her airy voice to hyper-stylized, detail-rich gloss-pop", also stating that "Poppy.Computers off-kilter recounting of microcelebrity, hiccuping vocals and intricate production help her neatly avoid that fate".

Year-end lists

Track listing
Credits adapted from Tidal.

Charts

Release history

Poppy.Remixes

Poppy.Remixes is a remix extended play (EP) by Poppy, released digitally on March 16, 2018 by Mad Decent. EP contains a remix of "Interweb" and four remixes of "Moshi Moshi", songs originally from Poppy.Computer.

Track listing
Credits adapted from Tidal.

Release history

References

2017 debut albums
Mad Decent albums
Poppy (entertainer) albums
Art pop albums
Bubblegum pop albums